This is a list of newspapers in the U.S. state of Washington. The list is divided between papers currently being produced and those produced in the past and subsequently terminated.

Daily newspapers

 The Daily World – Aberdeen
 The Bellingham Herald  – Bellingham
 Kitsap Sun – Bremerton
 The Daily Record  – Ellensburg
 The Daily Herald – Everett
 Tri-City Herald – Kennewick
 The Daily News – Longview
 Columbia Basin Herald – Moses Lake
 Skagit Valley Herald – Mount Vernon
 The Olympian – Olympia
 Peninsula Daily News – Port Angeles
 The Seattle Times – Seattle
 Spokesman-Review – Spokane
 Sunnyside Sun – Sunnyside
 The News Tribune – Tacoma
 The Columbian  – Vancouver
 Walla Walla Union-Bulletin – Walla Walla
 The Wenatchee World – Wenatchee
 Yakima Herald-Republic – Yakima

 Weekly, semi-weekly and monthly newspapers 

 Anacortes American  – Anacortes
 Auburn Reporter  – Auburn
 Bainbridge Island Review – Bainbridge Island
 The Reflector – Battle Ground
 Cascadia Daily News – Bellingham
 The Northern Light  – Blaine
 Quad-City Herald  – Brewster
 Wahkiakum County Eagle  – Cathlamet
 Camas-Washougal Post-Record   – Camas
 The Chronicle – Centralia
 Cheney Free Press – Cheney
 Chewelah Independent  – Chewelah
 Chinook Observer – Chinook
 Whitman County Gazette – Colfax
 Statesman Examiner  – Colville
 The Concrete Herald – Concrete
 Deer Park Tribune – Deer Park
 Islands' Sounder – Eastsound
 Eatonville Dispatch  – Eatonville
 Edmonds Beacon – Edmonds
 Enumclaw Courier-Herald – Enumclaw
 Federal Way Mirror  – Federal Way
 Ferndale Record  – Ferndale
 Journal of the San Juan Islands – Friday Harbor
 Forks Forum – Forks
 Issaquah-Sammamish Reporter – Issaquah, Sammamish
 Kent Reporter  – Kent
 La Conner Weekly News  – La Conner
 Leavenworth Echo – Leavenworth
 Lynden Tribune   – Lynden
 Lynnwood Times  – Lynnwood
 Mercer Island Reporter  –  Mercer Island
 Mill Creek View  – Mill Creek
 Mill Creek Beacon  – Mill Creek
 East County Journal  – Morton
 Newport Miner – Newport
 Snoqualmie Valley Record – North Bend
 South Whidbey Record – Oak Harbor
 Whidbey News-Times – Oak Harbor
 The Omak-Okanogan County Chronicle – Omak
 Okanogan Valley Gazette-Tribune  – Oroville/Tonasket
 East Washingtonian  – Pomeroy, Washington
 Port Orchard Independent   – Port Orchard
 The Port Townsend & Jefferson County Leader   – Port Townsend
 North Kitsap Herald – Poulsbo
 Quincy Valley Post-Register  – Quincy
 Redmond Reporter  – Redmond
 The Renton Reporter  – Renton
 The Facts – Seattle
 Madison Park Times – Seattle
 The Seattle Medium  – Seattle
 Queen Anne & Magnolia News  – Seattle
 Sequim Gazette  – Sequim
 Shelton-Mason County Journal   – Shelton
 Snohomish County Tribune – Snohomish
 Stanwood Camano News  – Stanwood
 Skamania County Pioneer  – Stevenson
 Tenino Independent & Sun News  –  Tenino
 Methow Valley News   – Twisp
 Vashon-Maury Island Beachcomber – Vashon
 Key Peninsula News   – Vaughn
 Woodinville Weekly  –  Woodinville
 Nisqually Valley News – Yelm

 Alternative newspapers 

 Inlander – Spokane 

 Digital only newspapers 

 Bothell-Kenmore Reporter – Bothell
 Bellevue Reporter – Bellevue
 Covington Reporter  – Covington
 Kirkland Reporter – Kirkland
 Northwest Asian Weekly – Seattle
 Seattle Post-Intelligencer – Seattle
 Seattle Weekly – Seattle
 The Stranger – Seattle

 Newspapers no longer in print 

See: Category:Defunct newspapers published in Washington

References

Washington